William Phipps (c. 1681 – 21 August 1748) was the Governor of Bombay from 9 January 1722 to 10 January 1729.

He was the son of Thomas Phipps, a successful London merchant who acquired an estate at Heywood near his native town, Westbury, Wiltshire. Among William's brothers was James Phipps of Cape Coast Castle. In due course William retired to Heywood, where he died.

A marble bust of Phipps by Robert Taylor is in the parish church at Westbury.

References

Governors of Bombay
Year of birth unknown
1748 deaths
People from Westbury, Wiltshire
Year of birth uncertain